Abel Tasman National Park is a New Zealand national park located between Golden Bay and Tasman Bay / Te Tai-o-Aorere at the north end of the South Island. It is named after Abel Tasman, who in 1642 became the first European explorer to sight New Zealand and who anchored nearby in Golden Bay.

History
The park was founded in 1942, largely through the efforts of ornithologist and author Pérrine Moncrieff to have land reserved for the purpose. Moncrieff served on the park board from 1943 to 1974.

The park was opened on the 18 December 1942 to mark the 300th anniversary of Abel Tasman's visit. Those in attendance at the opening ceremony at Tarakohe included Charles van der Plas, as personal representative of the Netherlands' Queen, Wilhelmina. The Queen was made Patron of the park.

The idea for the park had been under consideration since June 1938. The Golden Bay Cement Company donated the land where the Abel Tasman Monument and a memorial plaque was sited. The area's primary historic interest was the visit of Tasman in 1642, D'Urville in 1827, and the New Zealand Company barques Whitby and Will Watch, and brig Arrow in 1841. The site was also of significant botanical interest.

By 1946 the park had reached  in area with additional land purchases. A further  at Tōtaranui, formerly owned by William Gibbs, was acquired from J S Campbell in 1949 and added to the park. About  have been added since. In 2008 an extra , including the formerly private land known as Hadfields Clearing, were added to the park.

Description

It consists of forested, hilly country to the north of the valleys of the Tākaka and Riwaka Rivers, and is bounded to the north by the waters of Golden Bay and Tasman Bay / Te Tai-o-Aorere. It contains some of the islands off the coast including the Tata Islands in Golden Bay, and Tonga Island, Motuareronui / Adele Island, and Fisherman Island in Tasman Bay.

The park does not extend beyond Mean High Water Mark on the adjacent coast. Between Mean High Water and Mean Low Water Springs, the beaches are gazetted as a Scenic Reserve, covering  in total. The Tonga Island Marine Reserve adjoins part of the park.

Some of the birds that frequent the park are petrels, shags, penguins, gulls, terns, and herons. Possums, wild pigs, deer, and goats also frequent the park.

The Abel Tasman Coast Track is a popular tramping track that follows the coastline and is one of the Department of Conservation's Great Walks; the Abel Tasman Inland Track is less frequented. Other walks in the park, such as the Wainui Falls Track are considered 'short walks'. Kayaking, camping and sightseeing are other activities.

Access to the park is usually via the small settlement of Mārahau or Kaiteriteri (by water taxi). The nearest large town is Motueka,  to the south.

Management
The Department of Conservation administers the National Park.  The Scenic Reserve is administered by the Tasman District Council Chief Executive and Department of Conservation’s Nelson/ Marlborough Conservator.

Activities in adjoining coastal waters are Tasman District Council's responsibility. These areas operate under separate regulations.

Project Janszoon
In 2012 Project Janszoon, a privately funded trust, was set up to restore the park's ecosystems. The trust takes its name from Tasman's middle name Janszoon. It is aiming to complete the restoration in time for the 400th anniversary of Tasman's visit and the park's 100th anniversary in 2042.

The Department of Conservation and Project Janszoon developed a free virtual visitor centre for downloading to smartphones or tablets.  The application provides information about the Park's history, its flora and fauna, points of interest, weather, walking tracks, and tides.  This virtual visitor centre is free of charge and can be found through the App Store or Google Play Store.

See also
Forest parks of New Zealand
Regional parks of New Zealand
Protected areas of New Zealand
Conservation in New Zealand

References

External links

Information about the park, NZ Department of Conservation

 
Protected areas established in 1942
1942 establishments in New Zealand
Protected areas of the Tasman District
National parks of New Zealand
Golden Bay
Tasman Bay